Eupithecia laquaearia is a species of moth in the  family Geometridae. It is found in central and southern Europe and Russia.

The length of the forewings is 12–15 mm. Adults are on wing from May to July in one generation per year.

The larvae feed on Euphrasia species. The young larvae live in spun flowers of the hostplant. When older, they live in groups close to the flower or fruit. Larvae can be found in September.

References

External links

Lepiforum.de

Moths described in 1848
laquaearia
Moths of Europe
Taxa named by Gottlieb August Wilhelm Herrich-Schäffer